Kehila Kedosha Janina (Holy Community of Janina) is a synagogue on 280 Broome Street between Allen and Eldridge Streets in the Lower East Side neighborhood of Manhattan, New York City. It was built in 1925-27 and was designed by Sydney Daub and is now the only Romaniote rite synagogue in the Western Hemisphere. Romaniote traditions are separate from those of both Sephardic and Ashkenazi Judaism, deriving their lineage in the Eastern Mediterranean for nearly 2000 years, long before the Spanish Inquisition.

The building was added to the National Register of Historic Places on November 30, 1999, and was designated a New York City landmark on May 11, 2004. It underwent a major restoration in 2006 by architect Leonard Colchamiro, a descendant of one of the community's original founders.

History
Kehila Kedosha Janina holds the distinction of being the only Romaniote synagogue in the Western Hemisphere. The congregation was founded in 1906 by Greek Jewish immigrants from Ioannina, but the synagogue itself was not erected until 1927. The years from then until the Second World War were a time of prosperity for the Romaniote community in the Lower East Side: there were three rabbis in the synagogue, and on the High Holidays, there was often only standing room for synagogue services. After the Second World War, many congregants moved to other boroughs and parts of Manhattan, including Harlem, the Bronx, and Brooklyn, though these communities are no longer active.

Although the community has steadily dwindled since its pre-war heyday, services are still held on shabbat and Jewish holidays. While it maintains a mailing list of 5,000 persons, it often has difficulty meeting the minyan for shabbat worship. Guided tours are offered each Sunday to visitors and by special appointment.

The Janina Landsmanshaft has a burial plot at Wellwood Cemetery where there is a memorial to the Jews of Ioannina murdered in the Shoah.

Building layout
Kehila Kedosha Janina is somewhat unusual for a Romaniote synagogue in that it runs north south with the Ehal on the north side (Romaniote synagogues typically run east to west), the bimah is in the center of the main sanctuary (most Romaniote synagogues place the bimah on the west wall), and the internal stairway for the women's balcony. It is typical in the fact that men and women sit separately (a feature of all Orthodox synagogues). The second floor women's gallery contains a museum with artifacts, exhibits, and Judaica on Jewish life in Greece and the history of Greek Jews as well as a gift shop. Exhibited items are housed in cases along the walls on either side behind the seats, as well as in the area immediately in front of the staircase.

In popular culture
A documentary film about the synagogue and community, The Last Greeks on Broome Street, was produced in the early 2000s. It is directed, written and narrated by Ed Askinazi, whose great-grandparents were among the congregation's founders.

See also
List of New York City Landmarks
National Register of Historic Places listings in New York County, New York
Kehila Kedosha Yashan Synagogue
Yanina Synagogue

References
Notes

External links

Kehila Kedosha Janina Modiya (Jews/Media/Religion)
Kehila Kedosha Janina: The Last Greek Synagogue Documentary produced by The City Concealed

Greek-American culture in New York City
Greek-Jewish culture in the United States
Synagogues in Manhattan
New York City Designated Landmarks in Manhattan
Properties of religious function on the National Register of Historic Places in Manhattan
Lower East Side
Jewish organizations established in 1906
Synagogues completed in 1927
Romaniote synagogues
Orthodox synagogues in New York City
1906 establishments in New York City
Synagogues on the National Register of Historic Places in New York City
Jewish museums in New York City